The Great Warming is a 2006 documentary film directed by Michael Taylor. The film was hosted by Alanis Morissette and Keanu Reeves and even before its November 3, 2006, première helped establish an alliance between Democrats and Evangelicals trying to shake the administration out of its inertia on Climate change mitigation.

Theatre giant Regal Cinemas released the film in 34 markets on the weekend of November 4 to 5, 2006.  A special program was developed for faith communities, and the film was distributed to over 500 churches, synagogs and mosques across the US.

Summary

Featuring elements of the 2005 Public Broadcasting Service special Global Warming: the Signs and the Science, The Great Warming (produced by the same team), it talks to key researchers and reports on social justice and day-to-day impacts as well as emission statistics. It is also populated with everyday people from all over the United States and the planet who are feeling the brunt of global warming, and/or finding innovative ways to tackle it.

Reception

A review in Newsweek criticized the film by saying "The Great Warming shows exactly what's wrong with turning complex issues over to Hollywood: it's manipulative (it travels to Peru to report on the death of two boys from cholera contracted during a flood — implying a causal connection that serious scientists invariably warn against) and muddled in its use of scientific terms."

Variety said "Different countries and individual citizens are visited in intimate vignettes, but this personal approach seems inimical to any overarching sense of urgency and cohesion."

See also
 Politics of global warming (United States)
 Evangelical environmentalism
 An Inconvenient Truth

References

External links
 
 

2006 films
2006 in the environment
English-language Canadian films
American documentary films
Canadian documentary films
Documentary films about global warming
2006 documentary films
2000s English-language films
2000s American films
2000s Canadian films